Sebastian Walker is an investigative journalist and an Emmy Award-winning broadcast journalist, who is currently a correspondent and Middle-East bureau chief for VICE News Tonight on HBO.

Career

Al Jazeera English
Walker worked for Al Jazeera English in the United States from 2008 to 2016. First based at Al Jazeera English's main US bureau, in Washington, D.C. and then in Al Jazeera America's San Francisco Fault Lines show hub, he was a presenter on Fault Lines, the channel's flagship news magazine about the Americas, and reported from across the continent.

Before joining Fault Lines, Walker was a foreign correspondent, with a particular interest in Haiti. Al Jazeera English was the only international TV news network to maintain a bureau in Haiti after the 2010 earthquake and Sebastian arrived in Port-au-Prince less than 24 hours after the earthquake hit to report on the damage. He then stayed on for a year and a half to document the progress of the relief effort. Walker was instrumental in discovering and documenting the United Nations' role in the 2010–13 Haiti cholera outbreak, the largest such outbreak in recent history. Walker won a DuPont-Columbia University Award in Broadcast Journalism for his work in Haiti. He continued covering Haiti at Fault Lines, which was awarded a News & Documentary Emmy Award for "Outstanding Investigative Journalism in a News Magazine" on 30 September 2014 for the episode "Haiti In A Time Of Cholera", which also earned a Peabody Award.

Walker has also repeatedly covered the Occupy movement in the US and the shooting of Michael Brown near St. Louis, Missouri which precipitated sustained protests.

Prior to being based in the Americas, Walker worked in the Middle East. He served at the channel's main broadcast centre in Doha, Qatar, where he helped to launch the channel.

Earlier career
Walker has worked for the Baghdad Bulletin, and various international news organisations, including Reuters and AFP, and has reported from a number of key countries around the Middle East region, including: Iraq, Libya, and Afghanistan.

References

External links
 Twitter account
 

Year of birth missing (living people)
Living people
Vice Media
News & Documentary Emmy Award winners
Peabody Award winners
American investigative journalists